David Bouard (born 12 March 1977 in Quimper, Finistère, France) is a retired French midfielder who last played for French Ligue 2 side Vannes OC.

His previous clubs include SM Caen, FC Lorient, Chamois Niortais and Stade Brestois 29.

Honours
Lorient
Coupe de France winners: 2001–02

Chamois Niortais
 Championnat National champions: 2005–06

References

External links

1977 births
Living people
Sportspeople from Quimper
Association football midfielders
Stade Malherbe Caen players
FC Lorient players
Chamois Niortais F.C. players
Stade Brestois 29 players
Vannes OC players
Ligue 1 players
Ligue 2 players
French footballers
Footballers from Brittany
Brittany international footballers